The 2012–13 UAFA Club Cup was the 26th season of the Arab World's inter-club football tournament organised by UAFA, and the first season since it was renamed from the Arab Champions League to the UAFA Cup. 22 teams participated to this tournament.

USM Alger won the tournament after beating Al-Arabi 3–2 on aggregate in the final.

Participating teams

Qualifying rounds

First round

African zone
Three teams play a tournament matches as a championship in Moroni, Comoros. Only one team qualify to the next round.

Asian zone

Second round

Knock-out stage

Bracket

Quarter-finals

Semi-finals

Final

Champions

Top scorers
Updated as of games played on 27 February 2013.

References

External links
UAFA Official website 
UAFA Club Cup 2012/13 - rsssf.com

 
2012-13
2012 in Asian football
2012 in African football
2013 in Asian football
2013 in African football